Giorgio Antonio Rasulo (born 23 January 1997) is an English semi-professional footballer who plays as a midfielder for Southern League Premier Central club Banbury United.

Rasulo has also previously represented England at U16 and U17 levels.

Early life
Born in Banbury, Oxfordshire, to an English mother and Italian father, Rasulo grew up supporting Serie A side Napoli.

Rasulo's first club as a child was Bloxham Boys FC which he joined at the age of 9, before joining the academy at Milton Keynes Dons.

Club career

Milton Keynes Dons
Rasulo quickly impressed and progressed through the academy and youth teams, being selected as captain for several age groups.

He made his debut for the Milton Keynes Dons senior team on 13 November 2012, in an FA Cup match against Cambridge City. His league debut followed on 27 April 2013 against Stevenage. Following this, Rasulo was among ten players to be offered an apprenticeships for next season. Rasulo was given the number 20 shirt for Dons' 2013–14 season and after making six appearances, on 9 May 2014, Rasulo signed his first professional contract with the club until June 2016.

In February 2015, he was loaned out to Oxford United for whom he made one substitute appearance before returning to his parent club. While at Oxford United, Rasulo was short-listed for LFE Apprentice of the Year for League One. On 26 March 2015, Rasulo joined Aldershot Town on loan until the end of the season. Rasulo made his Aldershot Town debut on 6 April 2015, in a 2–0 win over Torquay United.

In November 2015, Rasulo joined League One side Oldham Athletic on a youth loan deal. In January 2016, he returned to the Dons following the expiration of his youth loan deal with Oldham. On 8 March 2016, Rasulo rejoined National League side Aldershot Town until the end of the 2015–16 season.

Rasulo scored his first professional senior goal on 5 April 2016 in a 3–4 home defeat to Grimsby Town. Following the expiry of his loan with Aldershot Town, Rasulo returned to parent club Milton Keynes Dons. On 12 May 2016, it was announced that the club had extended Rasulo's contract after the club took up a one-year extension clause, keeping Rasulo at the club until the end of the 2016–17 season. On 30 June 2017, Rasulo signed another one-year extension to his contract with the club.

Following the conclusion of the 2017–18 season, Rasulo asked for, and was granted his release by Milton Keynes Dons, bringing his nine-year association with the club to an end.

Non-league
After briefly signing with National League North club Brackley Town, Rasulo signed for Southern Premier Central club Banbury United on 31 August 2018.

International career
Rasulo represented England at U16 level for the first time in November 2012. Rasulo's England debut came in the Victory Shield where in the final minute Rasulo curled in a goal to win the game 1–0 against Scotland U16. Rasulo then represented England at U17 level. Rasulo made his England U17 debut, in a 1–0 win over Faroe Islands U17.

Career statistics

Honours
Individual
Milton Keynes Dons Academy Player of the Year: 2014–15

References

External links
Giorgio Rasulo profile at the Banbury United F.C. website

1997 births
Living people
Sportspeople from Banbury
Footballers from Oxfordshire
English footballers
England youth international footballers
Association football midfielders
Association football forwards
Milton Keynes Dons F.C. players
Oxford United F.C. players
Aldershot Town F.C. players
Oldham Athletic A.F.C. players
Brackley Town F.C. players
Banbury United F.C. players
English Football League players
National League (English football) players
English people of Italian descent